Uçhisar is a village in Cappadocia, in Nevşehir province, Turkey. It is 7 kilometres east of Nevşehir, 12 kilometres west of Ürgüp, and 10 kilometres south of Avanos.

Situated on the edge of Göreme National Park, Uçhisar consists of an old village huddled around the base of a huge rock cone and a new one closer to the road that runs from Nevşehir town to Göreme. Like most of Cappadocia, Uçhisar once made a living from agriculture but now depends almost entirely on tourism, with many of its fine old stone houses turned into boutique hotels. French incomers and Turks returning from France have played a large part in the move to convert the houses into hotels.

Uçhisar means 'Outer Citadel' in Turkish and refers to the huge rock cone that is its central feature.

In 2000 a German woman called Evelyn Kopp bought a house in old Uçhisar and later published a book about the village, its history and traditions called Uçhisar Unfolding: The Many Faces of a Cappadocian Village.

History 

Uçhisar was first mentioned in a 14th-century chronicle by Aziz ibn Ardasir although the general area had been occupied from much earlier, perhaps from Hittite times. In the seventh century AD, the Byzantines created a 'buffer zone' in the area against Islamic expansion. The nature of the terrain was conducive to defence, while the camouflage of the buildings provided an improved defence against attackers. 

After their conquest of the region, the Selçuks also made use of the defensive possibilities of the area, creating small centres with caravanserais in the region.

Attractions 

Uçhisar is dominated by a 60-metre-high 'castle' which is actually a rock formation visible over a wide distance. Uçhisar Kalesi (Uçhisar Castle) is crisscrossed by numerous underground passageways and rooms, which are now mostly blocked or impassable but which served as residential areas and, perhaps, cloisters in Byzantine times. Perhaps around 1,000 people once lived in the castle although it is no longer inhabited today. It is open to the public and offers fine views from its summit.

Many fairy chimneys can be seen in and around Uçhisar, One of them houses a Jandarma (police) post.

The only rock-cut church inside Uçhisar is the sixth-century Church of St Basil which is inside a rock cone and not very easy to access.

The old village is full of lovely old stone houses, some of them with fine carvings on their facades. Many of them have been converted into hotels since 2000.

In the centre of the town a tunnel extends for about 100 metres below some of the houses. It was cut out of tuff (a type of rock) in earlier times and probably served as a link from the castle-fortress to the outside world and as a way of protecting their water supply.

The Pigeon Valley runs between Uçhisar and neighbouring Göreme, a walk of around two hours. Over the course of the years, many pigeon-houses were carved into the sides of the valley. Inside were many niches where pigeons could roost. Pigeon guano was widely used as a fertiliser into the 1970s. Pigeon droppings were also used to enhance the colours of the frescoes in the cave churches.

See also 
 Rock-cut architecture of Cappadocia

References

Bibliography
 Michael Bussmann, Gabrielle Tröger: Türkische Riviera, Kappadokien. Michael Müller Verlag, Erlangen 2003, 
 Peter Daners, Volher Ohl: Kappadokien. Dumont, 1996,

External links

 Uchisar Cappadocia
 Pigeon Valley, Cappadocia

Cappadocia
Populated places in Nevşehir Province
Underground cities in Cappadocia